The Teletype Model 33 is an electromechanical teleprinter designed for light-duty office use. It is less rugged and cost less than earlier Teletype machines. The Teletype Corporation introduced the Model 33 as a commercial product in 1963; the machine had originally been designed for the United States Navy. There are three versions of the Model 33:
 Model 33 ASR (Automatic Send and Receive), which has a built-in eight-hole punched tape reader and tape punch;
 Model 33 KSR (Keyboard Send and Receive), which lacks the paper tape reader and punch;
 Model 33 RO (Receive Only) which has neither a keyboard nor a reader/punch.

The Model 33 was one of the first products to employ the newly-standardized ASCII code, which was first published in 1963. A companion Model 32 used the older, more established five-bit Baudot code. Because of its low price and ASCII compatibility, the Model 33 was widely used with early minicomputers, and the large numbers of the teleprinter that were sold strongly influenced several de facto standards that developed during the 1960s and 1970s.

History 

Teletype Corporation's Model 33 terminal, introduced in 1963, was one of the most popular terminals in the data communications industry until the late 1970s. Over a half-million Model 32s and 33s were made by 1975, and the 500,000th was plated with gold and placed on special exhibit. Another 100,000 were made in the next 18 months, and Serial Number 600,000, manufactured in the United States Bicentennial year 1976, was painted red-white-and-blue and shown around the country during the last part of that year and the year after.

The Model 33 originally cost about $1000, much less than other teleprinters and computer terminals in the mid-1960s, such as the Friden Flexowriter and the IBM 1050. In 1976, a new Model 33 RO printer cost about $600.

Early video terminals, such as the Tektronix 4010, did not become available until 1970, and initially cost around $10,000. However, the introduction of integrated circuits and semiconductor memory later that decade allowed the price of cathode-ray-tube-based terminals to rapidly fall below the price of a Teletype teleprinter. 

"Dumb terminals", such as the low-cost ADM-3A (1976) began to undercut the market for Teletype terminals. Such basic video terminals, which could only sequentially display lines of text and scroll them, were often called glass teletypes ("glass TTYs") analogous to the Teletype printers. More-advanced video terminals, such as the Digital Equipment Corporation VT100 (1978), could communicate much faster than electromechanical printers, and could support use of a full-screen text editor program without generating large amounts of paper printouts. Teletype machines were gradually replaced in new installations by much faster dot-matrix printers and video terminals in the middle-to-late 1970s. 

Because of falling sales, Teletype Corporation shut down Model 33 production in 1981.

Naming conventions 
While the manufacturer called the Model 33 teleprinter with a tape punch and tape reader a "Model 33 ASR", many computer users used the shorter term "ASR-33". The earliest known source for this equipment naming discrepancy comes from Digital Equipment Corporation (DEC) documentation, where the September 1963 PDP-4 Brochure calls the Teletype Model 28 KSR a "KSR-28" in the paragraph titled "Printer-Keyboard and Control Type 65". This naming convention was extended from the Teletype Model 28 to other Teletype equipment in later DEC documentation, consistent with DEC's practice of designating equipment using letters followed by numerals. For example, the DEC PDP-15 price list from April 1970 lists a number of Teletype Corporation teletypewriters using this alternative naming convention. This  practice was widely adopted as other computer manufacturers published their documentation. For example, Micro Instrumentation and Telemetry Systems marketed the Teletype Model 33 ASR as "Teletype ASR-33".

The trigram "" became widely used as an informal abbreviation for "Teletype", often used to designate the main text input and output device on many early computer systems. The abbreviation remains in use by radio amateurs ("ham radio") and in the hearing-impaired community, to refer to text input and output assistive devices.

Technical information 

The design objective for the Model 33 was a machine that would fit into a small office space, match with other office equipment of the time and operate up to two hours per day on average. Since this machine was designed for light duty use, adjustments that Teletype made in previous teleprinters by turning screws were made by bending metal bars and levers. Many Model 33 parts were not heat treated and hardened. The base was die-cast metal, but self-tapping screws were used, along with parts that snapped together without bolting. 

As another cost-saving measure, the optional paper tape mechanisms were dependent on the keyboard and page printer mechanisms. The interface between the paper tape reader and the rest of the terminal was completely mechanical, with power, clock, and 8 data bits (which Teletype called "intelligence") all transmitted in parallel through metal levers. Configuration of user-selectable options was done with mechanical clips that depressed or released various levers. Sensing of punched holes by the paper tape reader was done by using metal pins which mechanically probed for their presence or absence.

Earlier Teletype machine designs, such as the Model 28 ASR, had allowed the user to operate the keyboard to punch tape while independently transmitting a previously punched tape, or to punch a tape while printing something else. Independent use of the paper tape punch and reader was not possible with the Model 33 ASR.

The tape punch required oiled paper tape to keep its mechanism lubricated. There was a transparent, removable chad receptacle beneath the tape punch, which required periodic emptying. The entire Model 33 ASR mechanism required periodic application of grease and oil in approximately 500 locations.

Everything was mechanically powered by a single electric motor, located at the rear of the mechanism. The motor ran continuously as long as power was on, generating a familiar humming and slight rattle from its vibration. The noise level increased considerably whenever the printing or paper tape mechanisms were operating. Similar noises became iconic for the sounds of an active newswire or computer terminal. There was a mechanical bell, activated by code 07 (Control-G, also known as BEL), to draw special attention when needed.

The paper tape reader and punch could handle 8-bit data, allowing the devices to be efficiently used to download or upload binary data for computers.

The mechanism was usually geared to run at a maximum ten characters per second speed, or 100 words per minute (wpm), but other slower speeds were available: 60 wpm, 66 wpm, 68.2 wpm, and 75 wpm. There were also many typefont options. The Teletype Parts Bulletin listed 69 available Model 33 type element options. The type element was cylindrical, with characters arranged in four tiers, 16 characters per tier, and thus was capable of printing 64 characters. The character to be printed was selected by rotating the type element clockwise or anticlockwise and raising or lowering it, then striking the element with a padded hammer, which would impact the element against the inked ribbon and paper.

It printed at a fixed 10 characters per inch, and supported 74-character lines, although 72 characters is often commonly stated.

The Model 33 could operate either in half-duplex mode, in which signals from the keyboard were sent to the print mechanism, so that characters were printed as they were typed (local echo), or in full-duplex mode, in which keyboard signals are sent only to the transmission line, and the receiver would have to transmit the character back to the Model 33 in order for it to be printed (remote echo). The factory setting was half-duplex, but it could be changed to full-duplex by the user.

The Teletype Model 33 contained an answer-back mechanism that was generally used in dial-up networks such as the TWX network. At the beginning of the message, the sending machine could transmit an enquiry character or WRU ("Who aRe yoU") code, and the recipient machine would automatically initiate a response, which was encoded in a rotating drum that could be preprogrammed by breaking off tabs. The answer-back drum in the recipient machine would rotate and send a unique identifying code to the sender, so that the sender could verify connection to the correct recipient. The WRU code could also be sent at the end of the message. A correct response would confirm that the connection had remained unbroken during the message transmission. To conclude the transmission, the sending machine operator would press the disconnect button. 

The receiving machine could also be set up to not require operator intervention. Since messages were often sent across multiple time zones to their destination, it was common to send a message to a location where the receiving machine was operating in an office that was closed and unstaffed overnight. This also took advantage of lower telecommunication charges for non-urgent messages which were sent at off-peak times.

It required less than 4 amperes at 115 VAC 60 Hz.

Communications interface 
The communications module in the Model 33 was known as a Call Control Unit (CCU), and occupied the space to the right of the keyboard and printer. Various CCU types were available. Most operated on the telephone network and included the relevant user controls; variants included rotary, DTMF ("Touch-Tone"), and card dialing. An acoustic coupler for a then-standard telephone handset was also available. Another CCU type was called "Computer Control Private Line", which operated on a local 20 mA current loop, the standard serial protocol for computer terminals before the rise of RS-232 signaling. "Private Line" CCUs had a blank panel with no user controls or displays, since the terminal was semi-permanently hard-wired to the computer or other device at the far end of the communications line.

Related machines 

The Model 32 line used the same mechanism and looked identical, except for having a three-row keyboard and, on the ASR version, a five-hole paper tape reader and punch, both appropriate for Baudot code.

Teletype also introduced a more-expensive ASCII Model 35 (ASR-35) for heavy-duty use, whose printer mechanism was based on the older, rugged Model 28. The basic Model 35 was mounted in a light gray console that matched the width of the Model 33, while the Model 35 ASR, with eight-hole mechanical tape punch and reader, was installed in a console about twice as wide. The tape reader was mounted separately from the printer-punch mechanism on the left side of the console, and behind it was a tray for storing a manual, sheets of paper, or other miscellanea. To the right of the keyboard was a panel that could optionally house a rotary dial or Touch-Tone pushbuttons for dialing a connection to a network via telephone lines. The printer cover in later units also featured sound-deadening materials, making the Model 35 somewhat quieter than the Model 33 while printing and punching paper tapes. All versions of the Model 35 had a copy holder on the printer cover, making it more convenient for the operator when transcribing written material.

Teletype Model 35 is mentioned as being used in "Experiment One", in the first RFC, . The Model 35 was widely used as terminals for the minicomputers and IMPs to send and receive text messages over the very early ARPANET, which later evolved into the Internet.

The Model 38 (ASR-38) was constructed similar to and had all the typing capabilities of a Model 33 ASR, plus additional features. A two-color inked ribbon and additional ASCII control codes allowed automatic switching between red and black output while printing. An extended keyboard and type element supported upper- and lower-case printing with some additional special characters. A wider pin-feed platen and typing mechanism allowed printing 132 columns on fan-fold paper, making its output similar to the 132-column page size of the then industry-standard IBM 1403 model printers.

More-expensive Teletype systems had paper tape readers that used light sensors to detect the presence or absence of punched holes in the tape. These could work at much higher speeds (hundreds of characters per second). More sophisticated punches were also available that could run at somewhat higher speeds; Teletype's DRPE punch could operate at speeds up to 240 characters per second.

Historical impact 

 ASCII was first used commercially during 1963 as a seven-bit teleprinter code for American Telephone & Telegraph's Teletypewriter eXchange TWX network using Teletype Model 33 teleprinters.
 The upper-case-only limitation of the widely-used Teletype Model 33 constrained many early computer languages and systems to communicate in ALL CAPS, establishing an association of this text stylization with early computing technology in general.
 The Teletype Model 33 series was influential in the development and interpretation of ASCII code characters. In particular, the Teletype Model 33 machine assignments for codes 17 (Control-Q, DC1, also known as XON) and 19 (Control-S, DC3, also known as XOFF) became de facto standards.
 The programming language BASIC was designed to be written and edited on a low-speed Teletype Model 33. The slow speed of the Teletype Model 33 influenced the user interface of minicomputer operating systems, including UNIX.
 A Teletype Model 33 provided Bill Gates' first computing experience.
 In 1965, Stanford University psychology professors Patrick Suppes and Richard C. Atkinson, in the pilot program for computer assisted instruction, experimented with using computers to provide arithmetic and spelling drills via Teletypes and acoustic couplers to elementary school students in the Palo Alto Unified School District in California and elsewhere.
 In 1971, Ray Tomlinson chose the "@" symbol on his Teletype Model 33 ASR keyboard for use in network email addresses.
 The serial ports in Unix and Linux are named "/dev/tty...", which is short for "Teletype".

See also 
 Teletype Model 28

Notes

References

External links 
 Photo of a Model 33 ASR
 Keyboard layout for Windows that simulates the ASR33 keyboard
 ASR 33 Teletype Information with movies and sound

Computer terminals
Telegraphy